The 20th Annual Screen Actors Guild Awards, honoring the best achievements in film and television performances for the year 2013, were presented on January 18, 2014 at the Shrine Exposition Center in Los Angeles. The ceremony was broadcast simultaneously by TNT and TBS 8:00 p.m. EST / 5:00 p.m. PST and the nominees were announced on December 11, 2013.

Rita Moreno was announced as the 2013 SAG Life Achievement Award honoree on July 22, 2013.

Winners and nominees
Winners are listed first and highlighted in boldface.

Film

Television

Screen Actors Guild Life Achievement Award 
 Rita Moreno

In Memoriam
Tom Hanks introduced a previously recorded "In Memoriam" segment which honored the life and career of the actors who died in 2013:

Peter O'Toole
Karen Black
Paul Walker
Dennis Farina
Julie Harris
Ed Lauter
Ken Norton
Tom Laughlin
Tony Musante
Deanna Durbin
Annette Funicello
Carmen Zapata
Milo O'Shea
Allan Arbus
Eydie Gormé
Bonnie Franklin
Steve Forrest
John Kerr
Juanita Moore
Joan Fontaine
Jeanne Cooper
Hal Needham
Michael Ansara
Richard Griffiths
Al Ruscio
Esther Williams
Joseph Ruskin
Marcia Wallace
Ned Wertimer
Jane Kean
James Avery
Dale Robertson
August Schellenberg
Eleanor Parker
Lee Thompson Young
Jean Stapleton
Jonathan Winters
Malachi Throne
Eileen Brennan
Cory Monteith
James Gandolfini

See also
 3rd AACTA International Awards
 66th Primetime Emmy Awards
 67th British Academy Film Awards
 71st Golden Globe Awards
 86th Academy Awards

References

External links

 20th Screen Actors Guild Awards  at the Internet Movie Database

2013
Screen
Screen
Screen
Screen
Screen
Screen Actors Guild Awards